Newton Wright Nutting (October 22, 1840 – October 15, 1889) was a U.S. Representative from New York.

Nutting was born in 1840 in West Monroe, New York. He pursued an academic course, studying law and was admitted to the bar. He commenced the practice of law in Oswego, New York.

From January 1, 1864, until January 1, 1867, Nutting served as member of the Oswego County school committee. He subsequently served as the Oswego County district attorney from January 1, 1869, until January 1, 1872.

Nutting later served as an Oswego County Judge, serving from January 1, 1878, until March 4, 1883, when he resigned to take a seat in Congress.

In 1882, Nutting was elected as a Republican to the 48th Congress and served from March 4, 1883, until March 3, 1885. He was defeated for re-election in 1884 by John S. Pindar.

Following his defeat, Nutting resumed the practice of law in Oswego.

In 1886, was elected to the 50th Congress. He was subsequently re-election in 1888 to the 51st Congress and thus served again from March 4, 1887, until his death. He was succeeded by his immediate predecessor, Sereno E. Payne.

Nutting died on October 15, 1889, in Oswego, New York. He was interred in Riverside Cemetery.

See also
List of United States Congress members who died in office (1790–1899)

General references

External links
 

1840 births
1889 deaths
Politicians from Oswego, New York
Republican Party members of the United States House of Representatives from New York (state)
19th-century American politicians
Oswego County District Attorneys